A Bichon Frisé ( or ; from , , meaning 'curly haired dog') is a small breed of dog of the bichon type.

Etymology

The French word  comes from Middle French  ('small dog'), a diminutive of Old French  ('female dog', cognate with English bitch), from Old English , and related to other Germanic words with the same meaning, including Old Norse , and German . While the English name for the breed, Bichon Frise, is derived from the French  meaning 'curly haired small dog'.

History

The Bichon Frisé is often depicted as a French dog. Although the Bichon breed type are originally Spanish, used as sailing dogs, also as herding dogs sometimes, the French developed them into a gentle lap-dog variety. The Bichon type arose from the water dogs, and is descended from the poodle-type dogs and either the Barbet or one of the water spaniel class of breeds. . 

Because of their merry disposition, the ancestral Bichons travelled much and were often used as barter by Italian sailors as they moved from continent to continent. The dogs found early success in Spain and it is generally believed that Spanish seamen introduced the early breed to Tenerife in the Canary Islands. Their association with European nobility began in the 13th century, entering the royal courts of Spain, Italy and France. In the 14th century, Italian sailors rediscovered the dogs on their voyages and are credited with returning them to continental Europe.

The Tenerife, often simply called the Bichon, had success in France during the Renaissance under Francis I (1515–1547), but its popularity increased in the court of Henry III (1574–1589), when it had become popular amongst French nobility as both a court companion and lap dog.

On 5 March 1933, the official standard of the breed was adopted by the Société Centrale Canine, the national kennel club for France.  On 18 October 1934, the Bichon Frisé was admitted to the stud book of the Société Centrale Canine.

The Bichon was brought to the United States in 1955.

The Bichon Frisé became eligible to enter the AKC's Miscellaneous Class on 1 September 1971. In October 1972, the breed was admitted to registration in the American Kennel Club Stud Book. On 4 April 1973, the breed became eligible to show in the Non-Sporting Group at AKC dog shows. In 2001, a Bichon Frisé named J.R. won best-in-show at the Westminster Kennel Club Dog Show. In the United States, the Bichon Frisé was ranked the 40th most popular breed in 2013 according to the American Kennel Club.

The Bichon was introduced into Australia in the 1970s and since its introduction has proved successful as both a show and companion dog. In 1973, two American breeders emigrated to the United Kingdom with two Bichons, who produced a litter of five pups, introducing the breed into the country.

Description

Appearance 
The skull is slightly rounded and the muzzle is not pointy. The tail is groomed to be long and curly and is carried over the back. It has a black nose and dark round eyes; its white hair consists of a curly, dense coat with little shedding (much like a poodle in this respect), although many of the breeds do tend to have less curly hair than others. A small amount of buff, cream, or apricot colour may be seen around its ears, snout, paws or body, but normally these colours do not exceed 10% of its body. FCI/AKC Standard coat colour is pure white; other colours such as apricot or grey and brown are not recognised. A white coat is preferred in the show ring. The head and legs are proportionate in size to the body, and the ears and tail are natural (not docked or cropped).

Temperament
The American Kennel Club refers to the Bichon Frisé as "merry" and "curious", and the breed standard calls for a dog that is "gentle mannered, sensitive, playful and affectionate." The dogs are generally very sociable and do well with an owner who takes them along on outings, and are affectionate and intelligent. If affiliated with a particular territory and encouraged by owners, they can become very territorial.

Lifespan

Bichons Frisés in the UK, the United States, and Canada (according to surveys of their owners) have an average life span of about 12–15 years. This breed's longevity is similar to other breeds of its size, and somewhat longer than purebred dogs in general.

The oldest Bichons Frisés for which there are reliable records in various North American surveys have died at 21 years. While records show in London UK, Bambi is the oldest living Bichon Frisè at 18 years and 9 months. 

In a 2004 UK Kennel Club survey, the leading causes of Bichon Frisé death were old age (23.5%) and cancer (21%). In a 2007 US/Canadian breeders survey, the leading causes of death were cancer (22%), unknown causes (14%), hematologic (11%), and old age (10%). Hematologic causes of death were divided between autoimmune hemolytic anemia (AIHA) and immune-mediated thrombocytopenia (ITP). AIHA and ITP were responsible for the greatest number of Bichon Frisé "years lost" (a measure of the extent to which a condition kills members of a breed prematurely). While cancer is a more common cause of death than AIHA and ITP, Bichons Frisés that died of cancer died at a median age of 12.5 years. Hematologic deaths occurred at a median age of only five years. Bichons Frisés in the UK survey had a lower rate of hematologic deaths (3%) than in the USA/Canada survey (11%).

Health 

The Bichon Frisé is a relatively healthy breed. They may have cataracts, diabetes or allergies, which may lead to skin conditions and cause itching resulting in scratching and chewing their paws. Other health conditions that can be seen in Bichon Frisé are patellar luxation, heart disease, and liver disease.

For Bichon Frisé breeders, the Orthopedic Foundation for Animals (OFA) recommends screenings for  the following health conditions to receive CHIC certification: Hip Displasia, Patellar Luxation, CERF (eye health), cardiac evaluation, and Legg-Calves-Perthes.

Bichons Frisés are considered to be hypoallergenic as they do not readily shed (moult) and are thus generally suitable for people with allergies.

AIHA and ITP
Autoimmune hemolytic anemia (AIHA, also called immune-mediated hemolytic anemia, or IMHA) and immune-mediated thrombocytopenia (ITP) are responsible for many premature Bichon Frisé deaths. These diseases can strike with little or no warning and kill very quickly. In AIHA, the dog's immune system attacks its own red blood cells, leading to severe, life-threatening anemia. Symptoms include weakness, loss of energy, lack of appetite, vomiting, diarrhea, rapid heart rate, rapid breathing, dark urine, and pale or yellow gums.

ITP often accompanies AIHA. In ITP, blood platelets (which cause blood clotting) are destroyed. The most common clinical signs are haemorrhages of the skin and mucous membranes. Mortality rates of 20% to 80% are reported.

See also
 
 List of dog breeds

References

External links

FCI breeds
Companion dogs
Toy dogs
Dog breeds originating in the Canary Islands
Dog breeds originating in Belgium
Bichon